Pacific Western Oil Corporation was a holding company for the stock of the Pacific Western Oil Company.

History 
In 1928, Pacific Western Oil was founded to acquire the oil producing properties and undeveloped oil properties in California of Petroleum Securities Company. The sole stockholders of Petroleum Securities were Edward L. Doheny and his family. Jacques Vinmont was the first Chairman of the Board and William C. McDuffie was President. The remaining initial Board of Directors were Earle Bailie, James R. Simpson, Lloyd Gilmour, Charles R. Blyth, Edward Nolan, George L. Eastman, and David P. Babcock. Pacific Western paid the Dohenys $25,000,000, which was said at the time to be the largest cash transfer in the West.

J. Paul Getty was elected to the board in 1930 after he obtained a large number of shares. By the next year Getty had obtained a controlling share of stock of Pacific Western Oil. After this the board was expanded from nine to ten members. H. Paul Grimm was elected the new president of the board. Emil Kluth, H.M. Macomber, Fero Williams, and E.H. Parkford were also elected to the board.  

The company was awarded the Saudi Arabian Neutral Zone concession in 1948-49.  In 1956, the company became part of Getty Oil.

References 

American companies established in 1928
Defunct oil companies of the United States
American companies disestablished in 1956